Sir Banastre Tarleton, 1st Baronet, GCB (21 August 175415 January 1833) was a British general and politician. He is best known as the lieutenant colonel leading the British Legion at the end of the American Revolution. He later served in Portugal and held commands in Ireland and England. Consequently, he had hoped to command British forces fighting the French in the Peninsular War. However, that position was given to Arthur Wellesley.

Tarleton's cavalrymen were colloquially known as "Tarleton's Raiders". During most of his service in North America, he led the British Legion, a provincial unit organised in New York in 1778. After returning to Great Britain in 1781 at the age of 27, Tarleton was elected a Member of Parliament for Liverpool and returned to office in the early 19th century. As such, Tarleton became a prominent Whig politician despite his young man's reputation as a roué. Tarleton came from a family of slavers, and reflected that during his political career, where he was a prominent opponent of British abolitionists.

Early life 
Banastre Tarleton was the third of seven children born to merchant John Tarleton (1718–1773), who served as Mayor of Liverpool in 1764 and was involved in the transatlantic slave trade. His paternal grandfather Thomas Tarleton had been a shipowner and slave trader.

Banastre's younger brother John (1755–1841) entered the family business. He was elected as a member of Parliament (MP).

Tarleton was educated at the Middle Temple, London and went to University College, Oxford, in 1771, preparing for a career as a lawyer. In 1773 at the age of 19, he inherited £5,000 on his father's death. He squandered almost all of it in less than a year on gambling and women, mostly at the Cocoa Tree club in London. In 1775 he purchased a commission as a cavalry officer (cornet) in the 1st Dragoon Guards (effective from 2 May 1775), where he proved to be a gifted horseman and leader of troops. Owing to his abilities, he worked his way up through the ranks to lieutenant colonel without having to purchase any further commissions.

American War of Independence 
In December 1775, at the age of 21, the volunteer-soldier Banastre Tarleton sailed from Cork to North America, where the American War of Independence (1775–83) had broken out. Tarleton sailed with Lord Cornwallis as part of an expedition to capture the southern city of Charleston, South Carolina. After that expedition failed, at the Battle of Sullivan's Island (28 June 1776), Tarleton joined the main British Army under command of General William Howe, in New York

Under the command of Colonel William Harcourt, Tarleton, as a cornet, was part of a scouting party sent to gather intelligence on the movements of General Charles Lee, in New Jersey. On 13 December 1776, Tarleton surrounded a house in Basking Ridge, and forced Lee, still in dressing gown, to surrender, by threatening to burn down the house; the prisoner of war, General Lee, was taken to New York, and later was used in an exchange of prisoners.

In the course of the colonial war in North America, Cornet Tarleton's campaign service during 1776 earned him the position of brigade major at the end of the year; he was twenty-two years old. He was promoted to captain on 13 June 1778. Major Tarleton was at the Battle of Brandywine and at other battles in the campaigns of 1777 and 1778. One such battle, in 1778, was an attack upon a communications outpost in Easttown Township, Chester County, Pennsylvania, which was guarded by troops commanded by Capt. Henry Lee III, of the Continental Army, who repulsed the British attack, and in which Major Tarleton was wounded.

Capture of Charleston 

After becoming commander of the British Legion, a force of American Loyalist cavalry and light infantry, also called Tarleton's Raiders, Tarleton went to South Carolina, at the beginning of 1780. There, Tarleton's Raiders supported Sir Henry Clinton in the siege operations that culminated in the capture of Charleston. The siege and capture of the city were part of the British strategy in the southern military theatre meant to restore royal authority over the southern colonies of British North America.

Battle of Waxhaws 

On 29 May 1780, Colonel Tarleton, with a force of 149 mounted soldiers, overtook a detachment of 350 to 380 Virginia Continentals, led by Colonel Abraham Buford, who refused to surrender or to stop his march. Only after sustaining many casualties did Buford order the American soldiers to surrender. Nonetheless, Tarleton's forces ignored the white flag and massacred the soldiers of Buford's detachment; 113 American soldiers were killed, 203 were captured, and 150 were severely wounded. The British army casualties were 5 soldiers killed and 12 soldiers wounded. From the perspective of the British Army, the affair of the massacre is known as the Battle of Waxhaw Creek. In that time, the American rebels used the phrase "Tarleton's quarter" (shooting after surrender) as meaning "no quarter offered". 

An eye-witness, the American field surgeon Robert Brownfield, wrote that Colonel Buford raised the white flag of surrender to the British Legion, "expecting the usual treatment sanctioned by civilized warfare"; yet, while Buford called for quarter, Colonel Tarleton's horse was shot with a musket ball, felling horse and man. On seeing that, the Loyalist cavalrymen believed that the Virginia Continentals had shot their commander – while they asked him for mercy. Enraged, the Loyalist troops attacked the Virginians with an "indiscriminate carnage never surpassed by the most ruthless atrocities of the most barbarous savages"; in the aftermath, the British Legion soldiers killed wounded American soldiers where they lay.

Tarleton's account, published in 1787, said that his horse had been shot from under him, and that his soldiers, thinking him dead, engaged in "a vindictive asperity not easily restrained".

Regardless of the extent to which they were true or false, the reports of British atrocities motivated Whig-leaning colonials to support the American Revolution. On the other hand, Tarleton advocated repression of the civilian population, and criticized the mildness of Lord Cornwallis's methods, because moderation "did not reconcile enemies, but ... discourages friends". In either event, on 7 October 1780, at the Battle of Kings Mountain, South Carolina, soldiers of the Continental Army, having heard of the slaughter at Waxhaw Creek, killed American Loyalists who had surrendered after a sniper killed their British commanding officer, Maj. Patrick Ferguson.

Subsequent operations 
In South Carolina, Tarleton's British Legion were harried by Francis Marion, "The Swamp Fox", an American militia commander who practiced guerrilla warfare against the British. Throughout the campaigns, Tarleton was unable to capture him or thwart his operations. Marion's local popularity among anti-British South Carolinians ensured continual aid and comfort for the American cause. In contrast, Colonel Tarleton alienated the colonial citizens with arbitrary confiscations of cattle and food stocks.

Tarleton materially helped Cornwallis to win the Battle of Camden in August 1780. On 22 August, he was promoted to major in the 79th Regiment of Foot (Royal Liverpool Volunteers). He defeated Thomas Sumter at Fishing Creek, aka "Catawba Fords", but was less successful when he encountered the same general at Blackstock's Farm in November 1780.

On 17 January 1781, Tarleton's forces were virtually destroyed by American Brigadier General Daniel Morgan at the Battle of Cowpens. Tarleton and about 200 men escaped the battlefield. William Washington commanded the rebel cavalry; he was attacked by the British commander and two of his men. Tarleton was stopped by Washington himself, who attacked him with his sword, calling out, "Where is now the boasting Tarleton?" A cornet of the 17th, Thomas Patterson, rode up to strike Washington but was shot and killed by Washington's orderly trumpeter. Washington survived this assault and in the process wounded Tarleton's right hand with a sabre blow, while Tarleton creased Washington's knee with a pistol shot that also wounded his horse. Washington pursued Tarleton for sixteen miles, but gave up the chase when he came to the plantation of Adam Goudylock near Thicketty Creek. Tarleton was able to escape capture by forcing Goudylock to serve as a guide.

He was successful in a skirmish at Torrence's Tavern while the British crossed the Catawba River (Cowan's Ford Skirmish, 1 February 1781) and took part in the Battle of Guilford Courthouse in March 1781. With his men, Tarleton marched with Cornwallis into Virginia. There he carried out a series of small expeditions while in Virginia. Among them was a raid on Charlottesville, where the state government had relocated following the British occupation of the capital at Richmond. He was trying to capture Governor Thomas Jefferson and members of the Virginia legislature. The raid was partially foiled by the ride of Jack Jouett, with Jefferson and all but seven of the legislators escaping over the mountains. Tarleton destroyed arms and munitions and succeeded in dispersing the Assembly.

Tarleton was brevetted to lieutenant-colonel in the 79th Foot on 26 June 1781. In July 1781, some of his forces allegedly were involved in Francisco's Fight, an alleged skirmish between colonial Peter Francisco and nine of Tarleton's dragoons, which resulted in one dead, eight wounded and Francisco capturing eight horses. After other missions, Cornwallis instructed Tarleton to hold Gloucester Point, during the Siege of Yorktown. On 4 October 1781, the French Lauzun's Legion and the British cavalry, commanded by Tarleton, skirmished at Gloucester Point. Tarleton was unhorsed, and Lauzun's Legion drove the British within their lines before being ordered to withdraw by the Marquis de Choisy. The Legion suffered three Hussars killed with two officers and eleven Hussars wounded. Fifty British were killed or wounded, including Tarleton. The British surrendered Gloucester Point to the French and Americans after the surrender at Yorktown in October 1781. After the surrender, the senior British officers were invited to dinner by their American captors, and the only one not to get an invitation was Tarleton. He returned to Britain on parole, finished with this war at the age of 27.

Post-war years 
Tarleton had lost two fingers from a musket ball received in his right hand during the Battle of Guilford Courthouse in North Carolina, but "his crippled hand was to prove an electoral asset" back home. The condition of his hand is disguised in the pose of his 1782 portrait (shown in this article) by Sir Joshua Reynolds.

After his return to Great Britain, Tarleton wrote a history of his experience in the war in North America, entitled Campaigns of 1780 and 1781 in the Southern Provinces of North America (London, 1781). He portrayed his own actions in the Carolinas favourably and questioned decisions made by Cornwallis. It was criticized by Lieutenant Roderick Mackenzie in his Strictures on Lieutenant-Colonel Tarleton's History (1781) and in the Cornwallis Correspondence.

Politics 
In 1784, Tarleton stood for election as M.P. for Liverpool, but was narrowly defeated. In 1790 he succeeded Richard Pennant as MP, and, with the exception of a single year, was re-elected to the House of Commons until 1812. He was a supporter of Charles James Fox despite their opposing views on the British role in the American War of Independence.

Tarleton spoke on military matters and a variety of other subjects.  Tarleton was noted for his proslavery attitudes, supporting the slave trade due to its importance to the Liverpool economy as a major shipping port in the triangular trade. He worked to preserve the slavery business with his brothers Clayton and Thomas, and he became well known for his taunting and mockery of the British abolitionists. He generally voted with the Parliamentary opposition. When the Fox-North Coalition came to power, he supported the government nominally headed by William Cavendish-Bentinck, 3rd Duke of Portland.

He was appointed governor of Berwick and Holy Island in 1808.
In 1815, he was made a baronet and in 1820 a Knight Grand Cross of the Order of the Bath (GCB).

Subsequent military career 
Tarleton continued to serve in the army and was promoted to colonel on 22 November 1790, to major-general on 4 October 1794 and to lieutenant-general on 1 January 1801. Whilst on service in Portugal, Tarleton succeeded William Henry Vane, 3rd Earl of Darlington as colonel of the Princess of Wales's Fencible Dragoons in 1799. Tarleton was appointed colonel of the 21st Light Dragoons on 24 July 1802. He was brevetted to general on 1 January 1812. He had hoped to be appointed to command British forces in the Peninsular War, but the position was instead given to Wellington. He held a military command in Ireland and another in England.

Personal life 

Tarleton had a 15-year relationship with the actress and writer Mary Robinson (Perdita)  whom he initially seduced on a bet.  She was an ex-mistress of the future King George IV while he was still Prince of Wales. Tarleton and Robinson had no children; in 1783 Robinson had a miscarriage. She was important to his parliamentary career, writing many of his speeches. His portrait was painted by both Joshua Reynolds, who showed him at battle in the American Revolution, and Thomas Gainsborough.

Tarleton ultimately married Susan Bertie, the young, illegitimate and wealthy daughter of the 4th Duke of Ancaster in 1798. Tarleton had no children with Bertie. Tarleton did however, father an illegitimate daughter in 1797, prior to his marriage. The child was named Banina Georgina (1797–1818), her mother being named simply as Kolina.

Tarleton died in January 1833, at Leintwardine, Herefordshire.

Legacy 
 Tarleton Street in Liverpool.
 Banastre – a vessel that the Tarletons named for Banastre Tarleton
 The house at the site of his defeat in Pennsylvania came to be known as "Tarleton."
 The Tarleton Nursery School in Berwyn, Pennsylvania could possibly have been named for him.
 The "General Tarleton Inn" in Ferrensby, North Yorkshire, is named after him.
Tarleton Square apartment complex in Charlottesville, Virginia appears to have been named for him.
Tarleton Street, in Centreville, Virginia, is named after him.

Representation in other media 
 In the 1835 novel Horse-Shoe Robinson by John Pendleton Kennedy, a historical romance set against the Southern campaigns in the American War of Independence, fictional characters interact with the historic figure of Tarleton. He is depicted as a forceful martial character, sensitive to the duties of honour and chivalry.
 In the 1959–1961 American Disney television series The Swamp Fox, John Sutton portrayed Colonel Banastre Tarleton.
 In the alternate history series The Domination by S. M. Stirling, Castle Tarleton, in the Domination capitol Archona, is named after him.
 In the novel Sharpe's Eagle by Bernard Cornwell (the first in the Richard Sharpe series), the novel's main antagonist, Colonel Sir Henry Simmerson is said to be a cousin of Tarleton. He relies on his cousin's political connections to support his position.
 In the 1986 film Sweet Liberty Tarleton is played by actor Michael Caine and portrayed to the history professor Michael Burgess' (Alan Alda) dismay as a romantic, dashing hero.
 In the 2000 film The Patriot, the fictitious Colonel William Tavington (played by Jason Isaacs) was based on Tarleton.
 In the 2006 film Amazing Grace, Tarleton is played by Ciarán Hinds and is portrayed as a leading supporter of the slave trade and a major opponent of William Wilberforce.
 In the episode "The Sin Eater" of the 2013 TV series Sleepy Hollow, a villainous British army officer named "Colonel Tarleton," played by actor Craig Parker, is featured as the commander of protagonist Ichabod Crane. during a flashback to Crane's service in the Revolutionary War. Other than the name and his cruelty towards accused colonial rebels, it is unclear whether or not the character is based on the historical Tarleton. He turns out to be a demon disguised in human form, and is listed in the credits only as "Tarleton Demon."
 In Rick Riordan's spin-off novel The Blood of Olympus, Banastre Tarleton is mentioned to be a Roman demigod; his mother is Bellona, the Roman Goddess of War.
 Tarleton is a minor character in Diana Gabaldon's novel Written in My Own Heart's Blood, part of the Outlander series.
 Tarleton is a character in Donna Thorland's 2016 historical fiction novel The Dutch Girl.  He is depicted as a cruel womanizing soldier determined to get what, and whom, he wants.
 The 1971 science-fiction book The Star Treasure by Keith Laumer has a protagonist named Banastre Tarleton. The story and character have no connection with the historical figure of that name.
In the Matthew Hervey novels by the writer Allan Mallinson, General Tarleton is often referenced in the context of Herveys friend and mentor Daniel Coates, whom had (fictionally) been Tarletons Trumpeter Corporal during his own long Cavalry Service where he gained the skills to tutor the young Hervey during his childhood and influenced his decision to join the 6th Light Dragoons. General Tarleton features in person in the eighth book of the series Company of Spears

Captured American battle flags sold at auction 
In November 2005, it was announced that four rare battle flags or regimental colours seized in 1779 and 1780 from American soldiers by Tarleton and still held in Britain, would be auctioned by Sotheby's in New York City in 2006. Two of these colours were the guidon of the 2nd Continental Light Dragoons, captured in 1779; and a "beaver" standard – possibly a Gostelowe List Standard No. 7 dating from 1778. The "Beaver" Standard and two other flags (possibly division colours) were apparently captured at the Battle of Waxhaws. The flags were sold at auction on Flag Day in the United States (14 June 2006).

Tarleton helmet 
Tarleton introduced to the British Legion, and wore himself, a leather helmet with antique style applications and a fur plume (woollen for lower ranks) protruding far into the upper front side. It is depicted in Sir Joshua Reynolds' portrait of Tarleton above and was named after the officer. The helmet was used by British horse artillery troops until the end of the Napoleonic Wars as well as by light dragoon regiments from about 1796 to 1812.
It was based the Continental European dragoon helmet that became popular in several other armies before it fell out of fashion.

Bibliography 
 Bass, Robert D. The Green Dragoon, Sandlapper Pub. Co. 500pp. 2003.
 
 Scotti, Anthony J. Brutal Virtue: The Myth and Reality of Banastre Tarleton, Heritage Books, 302pp., 2002. .
 Wilson, David K. The southern strategy: Britain's conquest of South Carolina and Georgia, 1775–1780. University of South Carolina Press, 2005.

References 

General
 
 A Sketch of the Life of Brig. General Francis Marion by William Dobein James, A.M. (Member of Marion's Militia)
 
 Cassell's Biographical Dictionary of the American War of Independence, 1763–1783 by Mark Mayo Boatner (Cassell, London, 1966. )
 Oller, John. The Swamp Fox: How Francis Marion Saved the American Revolution. Boston: Da Capo Press, 2016. .

External links 

 Banastre Tarleton: A B
 bantarleton.co.uk, the website of a living history organization that portrays one of Tarleton's units at Revolutionary War Reenactments and other living history eventsiography by Holley Calmes
 Banastre Tarleton and the British Legion  An excellent source with documented biographical sketches of participants both Patriot and British.
 
 Provincial forces available during American Revolutionary War, including Lieut. Col. Tarleton's 200 strong cavalry and infantry - for reference only.
 

1754 births
1833 deaths
Military personnel from Liverpool
1st King's Dragoon Guards officers
Alumni of University College, Oxford
Tarleton, Banastre, 1st Baronet
British MPs 1790–1796
British MPs 1796–1800
British Army generals
British Army personnel of the American Revolutionary War
Knights Grand Cross of the Order of the Bath
Members of the Parliament of Great Britain for Liverpool
Proslavery activists
South Carolina in the American Revolution
UK MPs 1801–1802
UK MPs 1802–1806
UK MPs 1807–1812
Members of the Parliament of the United Kingdom for Liverpool
People from Aigburth